Thomas Alfred Love (March 19, 1883 – May 1, 1955) was a Canadian politician. He served in the Legislative Assembly of British Columbia from 1941 to 1949  from the electoral district of Grand Forks-Greenwood, a member of the Coalition government.

References

1883 births
1955 deaths